Jannusan (Arabic: جنوسان) is a village in Bahrain, near Sar. A large number of foreigners, especially Britons, Americans and Japanese reside in the aforementioned area.

Populated places in the Northern Governorate, Bahrain